Operation Sumatra Assist was the Australian Defence Force's (ADFs) contribution to disaster relief in Indonesia following the 2004 Indian Ocean earthquake. ADF personnel were deployed within hours of the earthquake. They served mainly in Aceh.

Phase 2
At about 09:30UTC 2 April 2005, Sea King helicopter with call sign "Shark 02" crashed on the island of Nias, off the west coast of Sumatra during the humanitarian efforts in the aftermath of the 2005 Nias–Simeulue earthquake. Nine Australian Defence Force personnel were killed; 6 Navy and 3 Air Force personnel. Two others were recovered alive from the site by the other Sea King operating from HMAS Kanimbla and transferred to it for medical assistance in its hospital facilities.

References

External links
 Australian Department of Defence Operation Sumatra Assist

2004 Indian Ocean earthquake and tsunami
Non-combat military operations involving Australia